The Dow Jones Industrial Average (DJIA), Dow Jones, or simply the Dow, is a stock market index of 30 prominent companies listed on stock exchanges in the United States.

The DJIA is one of the oldest and most commonly followed equity indexes. Many professionals consider it to be an inadequate representation of the overall U.S. stock market compared to a broader market index such as the S&P 500. The DJIA includes only 30 large companies. It is price-weighted, unlike stock indices, which use market capitalization. Furthermore, the DJIA does not use a weighted arithmetic mean.

The value of the index can also be calculated as the sum of the stock prices of the companies included in the index, divided by a factor, which is currently approximately 0.152. The factor is changed whenever a constituent company undergoes a stock split so that the value of the index is unaffected by the stock split.

First calculated on May 26, 1896, the index is the second-oldest among U.S. market indices, after the Dow Jones Transportation Average. It was created by Charles Dow, the editor of The Wall Street Journal and the co-founder of Dow Jones & Company, and named after him and his business associate, statistician Edward Jones. The word "industrial" in the name of the index initially emphasized the heavy industry sector, but over time stocks from many other types of companies have been added to the DJIA.

The index is maintained by S&P Dow Jones Indices, an entity majority-owned by S&P Global. Its components are selected by a committee. The ten components with the largest dividend yields are commonly referred to as the Dogs of the Dow. As with all stock prices, the prices of the constituent stocks and consequently the value of the index itself are affected by the performance of the respective companies as well as macroeconomic factors.

Components
 the Dow Jones Industrial Average consists of the following companies, with a weighting  as shown:

Former components 

As of August 31, 2020, the components of the DJIA have changed 57 times since its beginning on May 26, 1896. General Electric had the longest continuous presence on the index, beginning in the original index in 1896 and ending in 2018. Changes to the index since 1991 are as follows:
 On May 6, 1991, Caterpillar Inc., J.P. Morgan Chase, and the Walt Disney Company replaced American Can, Navistar, and U.S. Steel.
 On March 17, 1997, Travelers Inc., Hewlett-Packard, Johnson & Johnson, and Walmart replaced Westinghouse Electric, Texaco, Bethlehem Steel, and F. W. Woolworth Company.
 On November 1, 1999, Microsoft, Intel, SBC Communications, and Home Depot replaced Goodyear Tire, Sears Roebuck, Union Carbide, and Chevron Corporation. Intel and Microsoft became the first and second companies traded on the NASDAQ to be part of the Dow.
 On April 8, 2004, American International Group, Pfizer, and Verizon Communications replaced AT&T Corporation, Kodak, and International Paper.
 On February 19, 2008, Chevron Corporation and Bank of America replaced Altria Group and Honeywell. Chevron was previously a Dow component from July 18, 1930, to November 1, 1999. During Chevron's absence, its split-adjusted price per share went from $44 to $85, while the price of petroleum rose from $24 to $100 per barrel.
 On September 22, 2008, Kraft Foods Inc. replaced American International Group (AIG) in the index.
 On June 8, 2009, The Travelers Companies and Cisco Systems replaced Motors Liquidation Company (formerly General Motors) and Citigroup. Cisco became the third company traded on the NASDAQ to be part of the Dow.
 On September 24, 2012, UnitedHealth Group replaced Kraft Foods Inc. following Kraft's split into Mondelez International and Kraft Foods.
 On September 20, 2013, Goldman Sachs, Nike, Inc., and Visa Inc. replaced Alcoa, Bank of America, and Hewlett-Packard. Visa replaced Hewlett-Packard because of the split into HP Inc. and Hewlett Packard Enterprise.
 On March 19, 2015, Apple Inc. replaced AT&T, which had been a component of the DJIA since November 1916. Apple became the fourth company traded on the NASDAQ to be part of the Dow.
 On September 1, 2017, DowDuPont replaced DuPont. DowDuPont was formed by the merger of Dow Chemical Company with DuPont.
 On June 26, 2018, Walgreens Boots Alliance replaced General Electric, which had been a component of the DJIA since November 1907, after being part of the inaugural index in May 1896 and much of the 1896 to 1907 period.
 On April 2, 2019, Dow Inc. replaced DowDuPont. Dow, Inc. is a spin-off of DowDuPont, itself a merger of Dow Chemical Company and DuPont.
 On April 6, 2020, Raytheon Technologies replaced United Technologies. Raytheon is the name of the combination of United Technologies and the Raytheon Company, which merged as of April 3, 2020. The newly combined conglomerate does not include previous subsidiaries Carrier Global or Otis Worldwide.
 On August 31, 2020, Amgen, Honeywell, and Salesforce.com replaced ExxonMobil, Pfizer, and Raytheon Technologies.

Investment methods
Investing in the DJIA is possible via index funds as well as via derivatives such as option contracts and futures contracts.

Mutual and exchange-traded funds
Index funds, including mutual funds and exchange-traded funds (ETF) can replicate, before fees and expenses, the performance of the index by holding the same stocks as the index in the same proportions. An ETF that replicates the performance of the index is issued by State Street Corporation.

Futures contracts
In the derivatives market, the CME Group through its subsidiaries the Chicago Mercantile Exchange (CME) and the Chicago Board of Trade (CBOT), issues Futures Contracts; the E-mini Dow ($5) Futures (YM), which track the average and trade on their exchange floors respectively. Trading is typically carried out in an open outcry auction, or over an electronic network such as CME's Globex platform.

Options contracts
The Chicago Board Options Exchange (CBOE) issues option contracts on the Dow through the root symbol DJX. Options on various Dow-underlying ETFs are also available for trading.

Annual returns 
The following table shows the annual development of the Dow Jones Index, which was calculated back to 1896.

History

Precursor

In 1884, Charles Dow composed his first stock average, which contained nine railroads and two industrial companies that appeared in the Customer's Afternoon Letter, a daily two-page financial news bulletin which was the precursor to The Wall Street Journal. On January 2, 1886, the number of stocks represented in what is now the Dow Jones Transportation Average dropped from 14 to 12, as the Central Pacific Railroad and Central Railroad of New Jersey were removed. Though comprising the same number of stocks, this index contained only one of the original twelve industrials that would eventually form Dow's most famous index.

Initial components
Dow calculated his first average purely of industrial stocks on May 26, 1896, creating what is now known as the Dow Jones Industrial Average. None of the original 12 industrials still remain part of the index.
 American Cotton Oil Company, a predecessor company to Hellmann's and Best Foods, now part of Unilever.
 American Sugar Refining Company, became Domino Sugar in 1900, now Domino Foods, Inc.
 American Tobacco Company, broken up in a 1911 antitrust action.
 Chicago Gas Company, bought by Peoples Gas Light in 1897, was an operating subsidiary of the now-defunct Integrys Energy Group until 2014.
 Distilling & Cattle Feeding Company, now Millennium Chemicals, formerly a division of LyondellBasell.
 General Electric, still in operation, removed from the Dow Jones Industrial Average in 2018.
 Laclede Gas Company, still in operation as Spire Inc, removed from the Dow Jones Industrial Average in 1899.
 National Lead Company, now NL Industries, removed from the Dow Jones Industrial Average in 1916.
 North American Company, an electric utility holding company, broken up by the U.S. Securities and Exchange Commission (SEC) in 1946.
 Tennessee Coal, Iron and Railroad Company in Birmingham, Alabama, bought by U.S. Steel in 1907; U.S. Steel was removed from the Dow Jones Industrial Average in 1991.
 United States Leather Company, dissolved in 1952.
 United States Rubber Company, changed its name to Uniroyal in 1961, merged with private Goodrich Corporation in 1986, tire business bought by Michelin in 1990.  (The remainder of Goodrich remained independent several more years but was acquired by United Technologies in 2012 and became a part of UTC Aerospace Systems, now Collins Aerospace, a Raytheon Technologies subsidiary.)

Early years
When it was first published in the mid-1880s, the index stood at a level of 62.76. It reached a peak of 78.38 during the summer of 1890, but ended up hitting its all-time low of 28.48 in the summer of 1896 during the Panic of 1896. Many of the biggest percentage price moves in the Dow occurred early in its history, as the nascent industrial economy matured. In the 1900s, the Dow halted its momentum as it worked its way through two financial crises: the Panic of 1901 and the Panic of 1907. The Dow remained stuck in a range between 53 and 103 until late 1914. The negativity surrounding the 1906 San Francisco earthquake did little to improve the economic climate; the index broke 100 for the first time in 1906.

At the start of the 1910s, the Panic of 1910–1911 stifled economic growth. On July 30, 1914, as the average stood at a level of 71.42, a decision was made to close down the New York Stock Exchange, and suspend trading for a span of four and a half months. Some historians believe the exchange was closed because of a concern that markets would plunge as a result of panic over the onset of World War I. An alternative explanation is that the United States Secretary of the Treasury, William Gibbs McAdoo, closed the exchange to conserve the U.S. gold stock in order to launch the Federal Reserve System later that year, with enough gold to keep the United States on par with the gold standard. When the markets reopened on December 12, 1914, the index closed at 74.56, a gain of 4.4%. This is frequently reported as a large drop, due to using a later redefinition. Reports from the time say that the day was positive. Following World War I, the United States experienced another economic downturn, the Post–World War I recession. The Dow's performance remained unchanged from the closing value of the previous decade, adding only 8.26%, from 99.05 at the beginning of 1910, to a level of 107.23 at the end of 1919.

The Dow experienced a long bull run from 1920 to late 1929 when it rose from 73 to 381 points. In 1928, the components of the Dow were increased to 30 stocks near the economic height of that decade, which was nicknamed the Roaring Twenties. This period downplayed the influence of the Depression of 1920–21 and certain international conflicts such as the Polish–Soviet War, the Irish Civil War, the Turkish War of Independence and the initial phase of the Chinese Civil War. After a peak of 381.17 on September 3, 1929, the bottom of the 1929 crash came just 2 months later on November 13, 1929, at 195.35 intraday, closing slightly higher at 198.69. The Wall Street Crash of 1929 and the ensuing Great Depression over the next several years returned the average to its starting point, almost 90% below its peak. Overall for the 1920s decade, the Dow still ended with a healthy 131.7% gain, from 107.23 to 248.48 at the end of 1929. In inflation-adjusted numbers, the high of 381.17 on September 3, 1929, was not surpassed until 1954.

Marked by global instability and the Great Depression, the 1930s contended with several consequential European and Asian outbreaks of war, leading up to catastrophic World War II in 1939. Other conflicts during the decade which affected the stock market included the 1936–1939 Spanish Civil War, the 1935–1936 Second Italo-Abyssinian War, the Soviet-Japanese Border War of 1939, and the Second Sino-Japanese War of 1937. The United States experienced the Recession of 1937–1938, which temporarily brought economic recovery to a halt. The largest one-day percentage gain in the index happened in the depths of the 1930s bear market on March 15, 1933, when the Dow gained 15.34% to close at 62.10. However, as a whole throughout the Great Depression, the Dow posted some of its worst performances, for a negative return during most of the 1930s for new and old stock market investors. For the decade, the Dow Jones average was down from 248.48 at the beginning of 1930, to a stable level of 150.24 at the end of 1939, a loss of about 40%.

1940s
Post-war reconstruction during the 1940s, along with renewed optimism of peace and prosperity, brought about a 33% surge in the Dow from 150.24 to 200.13. The strength in the Dow occurred despite the Recession of 1949 and various global conflicts.

1950s
During the 1950s, the Korean War and the Cold War did not stop the Dow's climb higher. A nearly 240% increase in the average from 200.13 to 679.36 ensued over the course of that decade.

1960s
The Dow began to stall during the 1960s as the markets trudged through the Kennedy Slide of 1962, but still managed a respectable 18% gain from 679.36 to 800.36.

1970s
The 1970s marked a time of economic uncertainty and troubled relations between the U.S. and certain Middle-Eastern countries. The 1970s energy crisis was a prelude to a disastrous economic climate along with stagflation, the combination of high unemployment and high inflation. However, on November 14, 1972, the average closed at 1,003.16, above the 1,000 mark for the first time, during a brief relief rally in the midst of a lengthy bear market. Between January 1973 and December 1974, the average lost 48% of its value in what became known as the 1973–1974 stock market crash, closing at 577.60 on December 4, 1974. In 1976, the index reached 1,000 several times and it closed the year at 1,004.75. Although the Vietnam War ended in 1975, new tensions arose towards Iran surrounding the Iranian Revolution in 1979. Performance-wise for the 1970s, the index remained virtually flat, rising 4.8% from 800.36 to 838.74.

1980s

The 1980s began with the early 1980s recession. In early 1981, the index broke above 1,000 several times, but then retreated. After closing above 2,000 in January 1987, the largest one-day percentage drop occurred on Black Monday, October 19, 1987, when the average fell 22.61%. There were no clear reasons given to explain the crash.

On October 13, 1989, the Friday the 13th mini-crash, which initiated the collapse of the junk bond market, resulted in a loss of almost 7% of the index in a single day.

During the 1980s, the Dow increased 228% from 838.74 to 2,753.20; despite the market crashes, Silver Thursday, an early 1980s recession, the 1980s oil glut, the Japanese asset price bubble, and other political distractions. The index had only two negative years in the 1980s: in 1981 and 1984.

1990s
The 1990s brought on rapid advances in technology along with the introduction of the dot-com era. The markets contended with the 1990 oil price shock compounded with the effects of the early 1990s recession and a brief European situation surrounding Black Wednesday. Certain influential foreign conflicts such as the 1991 Soviet coup d'état attempt which took place as part of the initial stages of the Dissolution of the Soviet Union and the Revolutions of 1989; the First Chechen War and the Second Chechen War, the Gulf War, and the Yugoslav Wars failed to dampen economic enthusiasm surrounding the ongoing Information Age and the "irrational exuberance" (a phrase coined by Alan Greenspan) of the dot-com bubble. Between late 1992 and early 1993, the Dow staggered through the 3,000 level making only modest gains as the biotechnology sector suffered through the downfall of the Biotech Bubble; as many biotech companies saw their share prices rapidly rise to record levels and then subsequently fall to new all-time lows.

The Dow soared from 2,753 to 8,000 between January 1990 to July 1997. In October 1997, the events surrounding the 1997 Asian financial crisis plunged the Dow into a 554-point loss to a close of 7,161.15; a retrenchment of 7.18% in what became known as the October 27, 1997 mini-crash.

However, the Dow continued climbing past 9,000 despite negativity surrounding the 1998 Russian financial crisis along with the subsequent fallout from the 1998 collapse of Long-Term Capital Management due to bad bets placed on the movement of the Russian ruble.

On March 29, 1999, the average closed at 10,006.78, its first close above 10,000. This prompted a celebration on the trading floor, complete with party hats. Total gains for the decade exceeded 315%; from 2,753.20 to 11,497.12, which equates to 12.3% annually.

The Dow averaged a 5.3% return compounded annually for the 20th century, a record Warren Buffett called "a wonderful century"; when he calculated that to achieve that return again, the index would need to close at about 2,000,000 by December 2099.

2000s

On September 17, 2001, the first day of trading after the September 11 attacks, the Dow fell 7.1%. However, the Dow began an upward trend shortly after the attacks, and quickly regained all lost ground to close above 10,000 for the year. In 2002, the Dow dropped to a four-year low of 7286 on September 24, 2002, due to the stock market downturn of 2002 and lingering effects of the dot-com bubble. Overall, while the NASDAQ fell roughly 75% and the S&P 500 fell roughly 50% between 2000 and 2002, the Dow only fell 27% during the same period. In 2003, the Dow held steady within the 7,000 to 9,000-point level and recovered to the 10,000 mark by year end.

The Dow continued climbing and reached a record high of 14,198.10 on October 11, 2007, a mark which was not matched until March 2013. It then dropped for the next year due to the Financial crisis of 2007–2008.

On September 15, 2008, a wider financial crisis became evident when Lehman Brothers filed for bankruptcy along with the economic effect of record high oil prices which had reached almost $150 per barrel two months earlier. The Dow lost more than 500 points for the day, returning to its mid-July lows below 11,000. A series of bailout packages, including the Emergency Economic Stabilization Act of 2008, proposed and implemented by the Federal Reserve and United States Department of the Treasury did not prevent further losses. After nearly six months of extreme volatility during which the Dow experienced its largest one-day point loss, largest daily point gain, and largest intraday range (of more than 1,000 points) at the time, the index closed at a new 12-year low of 6,547.05 on March 9, 2009, its lowest close since April 1997. The Dow had lost 20% of its value in only six weeks.

Towards the latter half of 2009, the average rallied towards the 10,000 level amid optimism that the Late-2000s recession, the United States housing bubble and the financial crisis of 2007–2008, were easing and possibly coming to an end. For the decade, the Dow saw a rather substantial pullback for a negative return from 11,497.12 to 10,428.05, a loss of a 9.3%.

2010s

During the first half of the 2010s decade, aided by the Federal Reserve's loose monetary policy including quantitative easing, the Dow made a notable rally attempt. This was despite significant volatility due to growing global concerns such as the 2010 European sovereign debt crisis, the Dubai World 2009 debt standstill, and the United States debt-ceiling crisis of 2011.

On May 6, 2010, the Dow lost 9.2% intra-day and regained nearly all of it within a single hour. This event, which became known as the 2010 Flash Crash, sparked new regulations to prevent future incidents.

Six years after its previous high in 2007, the Dow finally closed at a new record high on March 5, 2013. It continued rising for the next several years past 17,000 points until a brief 2015–16 stock market selloff in the second half of 2015. It then picked up again early 2016 and climbed past 25,000 points on January 4, 2018.

On November 9, 2016, the day after Donald Trump's victory over Hillary Clinton in the U.S. presidential election, the index soared, coming within roughly 25 points of its all-time intraday high to that point.

Volatility returned in 2018 when the Dow fell nearly 20%. By early January 2019, the index had quickly rallied more than 10% from its Christmas Eve low.

Overall in the 2010s decade, the Dow increased from 10,428.05 to 28,538.44 for a substantial gain of 174%.

2020s
Despite the emerging COVID-19 pandemic, the Dow continued its bull run from the previous decade before peaking at 29,551.42 on February 12, 2020 (29,568.57 intraday on the same day). The index slowly retreated for the remainder of the week and into the next week, before coronavirus fears and an oil price war between Saudi Arabia and Russia sent the index into a tailspin, recording several days of losses (and gains) of at least 1,000 points, a typical symptom of a bear market as previously seen in October 2008 during the financial crisis. Volatility rose high enough to trigger multiple 15-minute trading halts. In the first quarter of 2020, the DJIA fell 23%, its worst quarter since 1987. The market recovered in the third quarter, returning to 28,837.52 on October 12, 2020, and peaked momentarily at a new all-time high of 29,675.25 on November 9, 2020, at 14:00 ET, following that day's announcement of the success of the Pfizer–BioNTech COVID-19 vaccine in Phase III clinical trials. The Dow (as reported by the UPI) closed over 30,000 on December 31, 2020, at a record 30,606.48. On November 24, following news that the presidential transition of Joe Biden was approved, the Dow increased by more than 500 points, closing at 30,046.24.

Calculation
To calculate the DJIA, the sum of the prices of all 30 stocks is divided by a divisor, the Dow Divisor. The divisor is adjusted in case of stock splits, spinoffs or similar structural changes, to ensure that such events do not in themselves alter the numerical value of the DJIA. Early on, the initial divisor was composed of the original number of component companies; this initially made the DJIA a simple arithmetic average. The present divisor, after many adjustments, is less than one (meaning the index is larger than the sum of the prices of the components).
That is:

where p are the prices of the component stocks and d is the Dow Divisor.

Events such as stock splits or changes in the list of the companies composing the index alter the sum of the component prices. In these cases, in order to avoid discontinuity in the index, the Dow Divisor is updated so that the quotations right before and after the event coincide:

 the Dow Divisor is 0.15172752595384 and every $1 change in price in a particular stock within the average equates to a 6.590761918 (1 ÷ 0.15172752595384) point movement.

Assessment

Issues with market representation
With the inclusion of only 30 stocks, critics such as Ric Edelman argue that the DJIA is an inaccurate representation of overall market performance compared to more comprehensive indexes such as the S&P 500 Index or the Russell 3000 Index. Additionally, the DJIA is criticized for being a price-weighted index, which gives higher-priced stocks more influence over the average than their lower-priced counterparts, but takes no account of the relative industry size or market capitalization of the components. For example, a $1 increase in a lower-priced stock can be negated by a $1 decrease in a much higher-priced stock, even though the lower-priced stock experienced a larger percentage change. In addition, a $1 move in the smallest component of the DJIA has the same effect as a $1 move in the largest component of the average. For example, during September–October 2008, former component AIG's reverse split-adjusted stock price collapsed from $22.76 on September 8 to $1.35 on October 27; contributing to a roughly 3,000-point drop in the index.

 Goldman Sachs and UnitedHealth Group are among the highest-priced stocks in the average and therefore have the greatest influence on it. Alternately, Cisco Systems and Coca-Cola are among the lowest-priced stocks in the average and have the least sway in the price movement. Critics of the DJIA and most securities professionals recommend the market-capitalization weighted S&P 500 Index or the Wilshire 5000, the latter of which includes most publicly listed U.S. stocks, as better indicators of the U.S. stock market.

Correlation among components
A study between the correlation of components of the Dow Jones Industrial Average compared with the movement of the index finds that the correlation is higher when the stocks are declining. The correlation is lowest in a time when the average is flat or rises a modest amount.

See also

 Closing milestones of the Dow Jones Industrial Average
 List of largest daily changes in the Dow Jones Industrial Average
 William Peter Hamilton
 S&P 500

References

Further reading

External links

 
 Dow Jones Industrial Average at NASDAQ
 Dow Jones Industrial Average at NYSE Euronext

 
1896 establishments in the United States
American stock market indices
Dow Jones & Company
S&P Dow Jones Indices